Japanese may refer to: 

 Something from or related to Japan, an island country in East Asia
 Japanese language, spoken mainly in Japan
 Japanese people, the ethnic group that identifies with Japan through ancestry or culture
 Japanese diaspora, Japanese emigrants and their descendants around the world
 Japanese citizens, nationals of Japan under Japanese nationality law
 Foreign-born Japanese, naturalized citizens of Japan
 Japanese writing system, consisting of kanji and kana
 Japanese cuisine, the food and food culture of Japan

See also
 List of Japanese people
 
 Japonica (disambiguation)
 Japonicum
 Japonicus
 Japanese studies

Language and nationality disambiguation pages